Thysanodonta chesterfieldensis is a species of sea snail, a marine gastropod mollusk in the family Calliostomatidae.

Description
The length of the shell attains 3.6 mm.

Distribution
This marine species occurs off the Chesterfield Islands, New Caledonia, at depths between 305 m and 410 m.

References

 Marshall, B.A. (1995). Calliostomatidae (Gastropoda: Trochoidea) from New Caledonia, the Loyalty Islands and the northern Lord Howe Rise. pp. 381–458 in Bouchet, P. (ed.). Résultats des Campagnes MUSORSTOM, Vol. 14 . Mém. Mus. nat. Hist. nat. 167 : 381–458

External links

chesterfieldensis
Gastropods described in 1995